Diamesinae is a subfamily of midges in the non-biting midge family (Chironomidae).

Tribes and genera
Tribe Boreoheptagyiini Brundin, 1966
Genus Boreoheptagyia Brundin, 1966
Genus Kaluginia  Fossil
Tribe Diamesini Pagast, 1947
Genus Arctodiamesa Makarchenko, 1983
Genus Diamesa Meigen in Gistl, 1835
Genus Lappodiamesa Serra-Tosio, 1968
Genus Pagastia Oliver, 1959
Genus Potthastia Kieffer, 1922
Genus Pseudodiamesa Goetghebuer, 1939
Genus Sympotthastia Pagast, 1947
Genus Syndiamesa Kieffer, 1918
Tribe Protanypini Brundin, 1956
Genus Protanypus Kieffer, 1906
†tribe Cretodiamesini Kalugina 1976
Genus †Cretodiamesa Kalugina 1976 Taimyr amber, Russia, Santonian
†tribe Eugenodiamesini Lukashevich and Przhiboro 2015
Genus †Eugenodiamesa Lukashevich and Przhiboro 2015 Tsagaantsav Formation, Mongolia, Early Cretaceous

References

Chironomidae
Nematocera subfamilies